Peadar Bracken (23 January 1887 – 19 January 1961) was an Irish Volunteer during Ireland's War of Independence. In 1914 he was elected Captain by the men of the Tullamore Company Irish Volunteers, before later being appointed Commandant of the Athlone Brigade area by Patrick Pearse. Bracken, alongside his comrade Seamus Brennan, are credited with firing the first shots in the 1916 rising in Tullamore. Bracken was under order from Pearse and took command off him for the duration of the 1916 rising. He commanded the critical GPO garrison outpost at O'Connell Bridge, Dublin during the Easter Rising. Later on in his career, in 1920, he was a senior officer in the Irish Republican Brotherhood branch in Tullamore, and commanding officer in chief of the Athlone Brigade. Bracken died on 19 January 1961.

Early life and family 
Peadar Bracken was born Peter Francis Bracken on 23 January 1887 in Sragh, Tullamore, King's County, Ireland. He was the second son of Joseph and Anne Bracken, who were well-known sculptors in the area. He had four brothers, Patrick, Bernard and James and Michael and one sister, Mrs J. Cahill.

Early career 
In 1902 Bracken joined the Gaelic League: Tullamore William Rooney Branch. In 1904 Bracken was recruited into the Irish Republican Brotherhood. He becomes a founding member of Sinn Féin in Tullamore in 1905. He emigrated to Perth, Western Australia in November 1911, and returned in September 1914 to Ireland upon hearing of the formation of the Irish Volunteers in late 1914 and was elected by the Tullamore Volunteers as their First Captain.

In 1914, Bracken was elected captain by the men of the Tullamore Company Irish Volunteers. Later, in 1915, he was appointed Commandant of the Athlone Brigade area by Pearse.

First Shots of the 1916 Rising 
Bracken, alongside his Seamus Brennan, are credited with firing the first shots of the 1916 rising. A month before the rising, a fight broke out in the Volunteer hall in Tullamore. A number of wives whose husbands were in the British army attacked the hall where a number of Volunteers and members of the Cumann na mBan were counting money which had been collected from a GAA match the day previous.  Bracken, alongside Brennan escorted the women home, and on returning to the hall a hostile crowd attacked the two men. Bracken discharged two shots in the air to keep them back, as did Breannan. They seriously wounded a member of the Royal Irish Constabulary (RIC), Sergeant Aherne. The RIC had attempted to disarm and arrest the Volunteers. Bracken holds the record as the initial shot firer. Pearse heard the news on Tuesday evening, 21 March 1916, from Bracken's second-in-command, Brennan. Brennan had escaped to Dublin after the Monday night affray and reported to Pearse's at St. Enda's College, Rathfarnham, Dublin.

Involvement in 1916 rising 

Bracken attended a Volunteer Convention which was held in Barry's Hotel, Gardiner Place, Dublin at the beginning of 1915. The Convention consisted of representatives from units all over the country, and Bracken was a Leinster representative. Here they discussed plans, and voted in favour of various agendas. In the autumn of 1915, in Scoil Éanna, Pearse gave Bracken the rank of Senior Officer in the Tullamore Company, and Chief Commanding officer in the Athlone Brigade. He told Bracken that a rising was imminent and instructed him to make every preparation to go into action in his own area when the signal was given to him. They decided on the type of signal he would receive. Bracken was in charge of the O'Connell Bridge section for the 1916 rising. He was part of the Kimmage Garrison. Bracken's role gave him power over placed three men on the bridge facing the GPO with orders to allow none of the enemy to cross the bridge. Bracken then occupied and took possession of a house, "Kelly the gunsmiths" (now called Kapp & Peterson's).

He was appointed on Easter Monday 24 April 1916: OC Kimmage Garrison & Captain GPO Garrison by Pearse, and OC O’Connell Bridge by James Connolly.

Bracken was imprisoned in Kilmainham Gaol following the Rising, and the National Museum of Ireland hold a prison biscuit he inscribed with his name and the date, 4 June 1916.

Other career events 
 1917 Elected to the Permanent IV Army Executive: Offaly Delegate.
 1918 Sinn Féin Convention re-elected him to IRA Army Executive and Appointed First Commandant Offaly IRA Brigade.
 1919 Appointed overall Commandant No 1 & No 2 Offaly IRA Brigades and Staff Officer to IRA-HQ.
 1920 Appointed IRA-HQ Organiser for: Offaly, East Kildare, & North Tipperary IRA Brigades, including the set-up of Dail (Sinn Féin) Police & Courts System.
 1923 January: Appointed First Clerk of Courts for Tullamore and later to the Daingean, Clara, and Ferbane Court areas.
 1934 Appointed: Commissioner-for-Oaths.
 1940 Appointed Staff Officer: Tullamore LSF (Local Security Forces), renamed later LDF (Local Defence Force) and held that the position until hostilities ended in Europe: 1945.

Later life 
In 1940 the Military Pension Application approved Bracken as a Grade ‘A’ (i.e. highest pension rank) and was awarded along with Medals for 1916 and 1919–21 (Tan) with Bar.

Death 
Bracken died at his home in Charleville road, Tullamore on 19 January 1961. His funeral took place with military honours to Clonminch Cemetery, Tullamore. Members of the old IRA, of the Army and FCA acted as guard of honour.  Five of Brackan's nephews, three of whom Paddy, Joseph and James Bracken were just home from service with the 32nd battalion in the Congo, acted with the firing party under Lieutenant P. Grogan, and the last post was sounded by a member of the Army from Athlone. Reverend J. Hurley Rahan delivered the funeral ceremony through Irish at the graveside.

References 

 

1887 births
1961 deaths
Irish Republican Army (1919–1922) members